Chimata Sambu is an Indian politician. He was a Member of Parliament, representing Bapatla in the Lok Sabha, the lower house of India's Parliament, as a member of the Telugu Desam Party.

References

External links
Official biographical sketch in Parliament of India website

Lok Sabha members from Andhra Pradesh
Telugu Desam Party politicians
India MPs 1984–1989
1953 births
Living people